Bloodroot is a 2017 album by Kelly Moran, released on Warp. The album has received positive reviews.

Recording and release
Moran composed the work on a prepared piano which she later modified for the 2018 release Ultraviolet.

Critical reception
Album of the Year sums up critical consensus as a 79 out of 100, based on two reviews. Seth Colter Walls of Pitchfork Media gave the release a 7.8 out of 10 for "melodic ingenuity" with the mix of instruments. In Exclaim!, Kevin Press rated Bloodroot an eight out of 10, calling it "impressive [and] captivating", drawing parallels between several contemporary classical music and avant-garde composers as well as black metal acts.

Track listing
All songs written by Kelly Moran
"Iris"– 1:52
"Celandine"– 3:06
"Freesia"– 2:22
"Hyacinth"– 3:24
"Liatris"– 2:10
"Bloodroot"– 3:27
"Calla"– 1:21
"Statice"– 3:21
"Aster"– 2:51
"Limonium"– 2:01
"Heliconia"– 5:04

Personnel
Kelly Moran– piano, electronics, songwriting, recording, production
Colin Marston– mastering
Kevin McKay– cover art

See also
List of 2017 albums

References

External links

2017 albums
Kelly Moran (musician) albums